Greenville Mid-Delta Airport , operating as Mid Delta Regional Airport until 2011, is a public use airport in unincorporated Washington County, Mississippi, United States. It is located five nautical miles (6 mi, 9 km) northeast of the central business district of Greenville, the city that owns the airport. It is served by one commercial airline, Contour Airlines, which is subsidized by the Essential Air Service program. Formerly, the facility was known as Greenville Air Force Base.

As per the Federal Aviation Administration, this airport had 6,310 passenger boardings (enplanements) in calendar year 2008, 6,290 in 2009, 6,609 in 2010, 7,417 in 2011, and 5,181 in 2012. The National Plan of Integrated Airport Systems for 2011–2015 categorized it as a non-primary commercial service airport.

Facilities and aircraft 
Mid-Delta Regional Airport is the only commercial airport located in the Mississippi Delta. A controlled airfield, MDRA has a control tower which is staffed from 7:00 a.m. to 7:00 p.m., seven days a week.

Runway 18L/36R is a precision approach runway with an Instrument landing System (ILS), medium approach lighting system with rails, (MALSR) approach lights and High Intensity Runway Lights (HIRLs). Runway 18R/36L is a non-precision runway with Medium Intensity Runway Lights, (MIRL). The runways are connected by six taxiways.

For the 12-month period ending December 31, 2009, the airport had 37,295 aircraft operations, an average of 102 per day: 47% military, 30% air taxi, 23% general aviation, and <1% scheduled commercial. At that time there were 17 aircraft based at this airport: 88% single-engine and 12% jet.

History 
Historically, Greenville had scheduled passenger service provided by Southern Airways commencing during the early 1950s from the former Greenville Municipal Airport (Mississippi) operated with Douglas DC-3 prop aircraft flying daily round trip routings of Memphis - Greenville - Vicksburg - Jackson, MS - Natchez - Baton Rouge - New Orleans and Memphis - Greenville - Vicksburg - Jackson, MS - Laurel - Hattiesburg - Mobile. Southern subsequently moved its service to Mid Delta Regional and in 1968 was operating six departures a day from the airport all with Martin 4-0-4 prop aircraft with three nonstop flights a day to its Memphis hub as well as three direct, no change of plane flights a day to New Orleans via various stops en route.  Southern subsequently began operating Douglas DC-9-10 jetliners from the airport on nonstop flights to Memphis with direct service to Baton Rouge and New Orleans via an intermediate stop in Monroe, Louisiana and also on a direct, one stop basis to Atlanta. Other DC-9 jet flights operated by Southern continued on direct, no change of plane routings to Chicago, Orlando and Fort Lauderdale.  The July 1, 1978 Southern system timetable listed two nonstop DC-9 flights a day to its Memphis hub as well as one nonstop DC-9 flight a day to Monroe with this service continuing on to Baton Rouge, New Orleans, Fort Walton Beach (served via Eglin Air Force Base), Orlando and Fort Lauderdale, and one nonstop DC-9 flight a day to Jackson with this service continuing on to Atlanta which also served as a hub for Southern.

Southern then merged with North Central Airlines to form Republic Airlines which in turn continued to serve Greenville.  According to the July 1, 1979 Republic system timetable, the airline was operating nonstop DC-9 jet service to Memphis where it was operating a hub as well as nonstop service to Monroe and was also operating direct, no change of plane DC-9 service to Atlanta (which also served as a hub for Republic), Baton Rouge, Fort Lauderdale, Fort Walton Beach via Eglin Air Force Base, Greenville/Spartanburg, SC, Huntsville/Decatur, AL, Miami, New Orleans, New York City via LaGuardia Airport, Orlando and Washington D.C. via Dulles Airport.  Republic subsequently ceased all flights from Greenville and had withdrawn from the market by 1986.

In 1989, Northwest Airlink nonstop service from Alexandria, Louisiana, Memphis and Monroe was being operated on a code sharing basis by Express Airlines I on behalf of Northwest Airlines (which was operating a hub in Memphis at this time) with British Aerospace BAe Jetstream 31 and Saab 340 commuter turboprop aircraft.

In May 2015, SeaPort Airlines announced that it planned to end service to and from the airport. After receiving proposals from four airlines, the Greenville city council unanimously chose Boutique Air as its next airline.

In July 2017, The US Department of Transportation has approved Greenville’s choice for subsidized air service. Boutique Air, which has been serving Mid Delta Regional Airport since 2015 would remain the carrier through 2021, with a caveat.

On 3 June 2018, a storm system destroyed the hangar and most of the aircraft at the airport.

On 1 March 2019, Boutique Air announced a new flight schedule beginning April 1, 2019 flying from Greenville Mid-Delta Airport (GLH) to Dallas/Fort Worth International Airport (DFW) and Hartsfield-Jackson Atlanta International Airport (ATL). Greenville to Atlanta is a new route that was recommended by the community, to give access to a larger cosmopolitan area and improve Greenville’s economic opportunity. Boutique Air retired service from Greenville to Nashville, TN on March, 31 2019. At the end of March, Boutique Air ceased all flights to Nashville International Airport and concentrate on flights to Hartsfield-Jackson Atlanta International Airport. Due to the pandemic, flights to Atlanta were changed back to Nashville in late 2020.

On 11 August 2021, Contour Airlines was announced as Greenville Mid-Delta Airport's (GLH) new federal Essential Air Service (EAS) air carrier, with daily service to Dallas/Fort Worth International Airport (DFW) and 5 weekly service (every day except Tuesdays and Saturdays) to Nashville International Airport (BNA). Contour Airlines replaced Boutique Air at the airport from 1 October 2021 and currently operates Embraer ERJ-135 regional jets on its services.

Airlines and destinations

Statistics

References

Further reading 

 Essential Air Service documents (Docket OST-2008-0209 ) from the U.S. Department of Transportation:
 Ninety-day notice (July 3, 2008) : from Mesaba Aviation, Inc. intent to discontinue unsubsidized service between Greenville, Mississippi and Memphis, Tennessee effective October 1, 2008.
 Order 2008-8-23 (August 25, 2008) : selecting Mesaba Airlines, Inc., d/b/a Northwest Airlink, to provide essential air service (EAS) at annual subsidy rate of $1,355,693 at Greenville, Mississippi, through September 30, 2010.
 Order 2010-7-12 (July 15, 2010) : selecting Mesaba Aviation, Inc., d/b/a Delta Connection, to provide essential air service at Greenville, Mississippi, at an annual subsidy rate of $1,606,662 thru September 30, 2011, or 180 days after Mesaba informs the Department of the retirement of the Saab aircraft Mesaba proposed for this service, whichever comes sooner.
 Ninety Day Notice (July 15, 2011) : from MESABA AVIATION, INC. and PINNACLE AIRLINES, INC. of termination of service at Greenville, MS.
 Order 2012-5-17 (May 22, 2012) : selecting Silver Airways, formerly Gulfstream International Airways, to provide Essential Air Service (EAS) at Muscle Shoals, Alabama, Greenville, Laurel/Hattiesburg, and Tupelo, Mississippi, and Greenbrier/White Sulphur Springs, West Virginia (Lewisburg), using 34-passenger Saab 340 aircraft, for a combined annual subsidy of $16,098,538.
 Order 2012-6-3 (June 6, 2012) : extending the Essential Air Service obligation of the two wholly owned subsidiaries of Pinnacle Airlines Corporation—Mesaba Aviation, Inc. and Pinnacle Airlines, d/b/a Delta Connection at the eight communities listed below (Muscle Shoals, AL; Alpena, MI; Iron Mountain/Kingsford, MI; Brainerd, MN; International Falls, MN; Greenville, MS; Laurel/Hattiesburg, MS; Tupelo, MS) for 30 days, through, July 9, 2012.
 Notice of Intent (April 9, 2014) : of Silver Airways Corp. ... to discontinue subsidized scheduled air service between Atlanta, Georgia (ATL) and each of Muscle Shoals, Alabama (MSL), Greenville, Mississippi (GLH), Laurel/Hattiesburg, Mississippi (PIB), and Tupelo, Mississippi (TUP). Silver Airways intends to discontinue this service on July 8, 2014 or such earlier date as permitted by the Department in any final order terminating the eligibility of any of these communities under the essential air service (EAS) program.
 Order 2014-4-24 (April 22, 2014) : prohibits Silver Airways Corp., from terminating service at Muscle Shoals, Alabama, Greenville, Laurel/Hattiesburg, Meridian, and Tupelo, Mississippi, for 30 days beyond the end of the air carrier's 90-day notice period, i.e. August 7, 2014. We are also requesting proposals from air carriers interested in providing Essential Air Service (EAS) at Muscle Shoals, Greenville, Laurel/Hattiesburg, Meridian, and/or Tupelo.
 Order 2014-4-26 (April 24, 2014) : directing interested persons to show cause as to why the Department should not terminate the eligibility ... under the Essential Air Service (EAS) program based on criteria passed by Congress in the FAA Modernization and Reform Act of 2012 (Public Law No. 112-95). We find that Greenville is within 175 miles of a large or medium hub, Memphis International Airport (MEM), a medium hub, and, thus, is subject to the 10-enplanement statutory criterion. We also find that during fiscal year 2013, Greenville generated a total of 5,836 passengers (inbound plus outbound). Consistent with the methodology described above, that results in an average of 9.3 enplanements per day, below the 10-enplanement statutory criterion necessary to remain eligible in the EAS program.

External links 
 Mid-Delta Regional Airport at City of Greenville website
 Aerial image as of March 1996 from USGS The National Map
 
 
 

Airports in Mississippi
Essential Air Service
Greenville, Mississippi
Transportation in Washington County, Mississippi
Buildings and structures in Washington County, Mississippi